Joseph Lewis may refer to:
Joseph Lewis Jr. (Virginia politician) (1772–1834), U.S. Representative from Virginia
Joseph Lewis Jr. (Florida judge), Judge on the Florida First District Court of Appeal
Joseph Horace Lewis (1824–1904), U.S. Representative from Kentucky
Hungry Joe (Joseph Lewis, 1850–1902), American swindler and bunco man
Joseph L. Lewis (1889–1968), American author and president of Freethinkers of America
Joseph H. Lewis (1907–2000), American B-movie director
Joseph Lewis (cyclist) (born 1989), Australian cyclist
Joseph Lewis (ice hockey) (born 1992), Welsh ice hockey player
Joseph J. Lewis (1801–1883), IRS commissioner
Bud Lewis (Joseph Lewis, 1908–2011), American golfer
JT Lewis (Joseph Lewis, born 2000), American political candidate
Trey Lewis (basketball) (Joseph Lewis III, born 1985), American basketball player

See also
Joe Lewis (disambiguation)
Joe Louis (disambiguation)
Jerry Lewis